Dionis Vodnyev (born 12 March 1971) is a Kazakhstani ski jumper. He competed in the normal hill and large hill events at the 1992 Winter Olympics.

References

1971 births
Living people
Kazakhstani male ski jumpers
Olympic ski jumpers of the Unified Team
Ski jumpers at the 1992 Winter Olympics
Sportspeople from Almaty